Stuart Park is a park located near Okanagan Lake in Kelowna, British Columbia, Canada. In winter, part of the park is turned into an ice rink for public skating. 

In 2015, the Canadian Institute of Planners named it the greatest public space in Canada.

What do I need to do before skating at Stuart Park?

The rink is open for drop-in use. No reservations are needed to skate in the park. It is recommended to check the live cam before heading down to the rink. Rentals for skates and bars are available on-site. For added COVID-19 Safety, please bring your own protective gear such as helmets, hand sanitizer, and face coverings. Rentals are open from 11 am to 8 pm daily, depending on the weather. If the temperature is below -10 degrees celsius, the rental shop will be closed.

References

Kelowna
Parks in British Columbia